Emperor Peak is a  glaciated mountain summit located in the Boundary Ranges of the Coast Mountains, in the U.S. state of Alaska. The Taku Range is a north–south trending ridge on the edge of the Taku Glacier. This mountain was named in 1964 by members of the Juneau Icefield Research Project, and officially adopted in 1965 by the U.S. Geological Survey.

Climate
Based on the Köppen climate classification, Emperor Peak is located in a subpolar oceanic climate zone, with long, cold, snowy winters, and cool summers. Weather systems coming off the Gulf of Alaska are forced upwards by the Coast Mountains (orographic lift), causing heavy precipitation in the form of rainfall and snowfall. Temperatures can drop below −20 °C with wind chill factors below −30 °C. The month of July offers the most favorable weather to view or climb Emperor Peak.

See also

List of mountain peaks of Alaska
Geography of Alaska

References

Gallery

External links
 Emperor Peak: Flickr photo
 Emperor Peak weather forecast
 Emperor Peak from north with Taku Towers: Flickr photo

Mountains of Alaska
Mountains of Juneau, Alaska
Boundary Ranges
North American 2000 m summits